A pecten (plural pectens or pectines) is a comb-like structure, widely found in the biological world. Although pectens in various animals look similar, they have a varied range of uses, from grooming and filtering to sensory adaptations.

Etymology 
The adjective, pectinate, means supplied with a comb-like structure. This form, cognate to pecten with both derived from the Latin for comb, pectin  (genitive pectinis), is reflected in numerous scientific names in forms such as pectinata, pectinatus or pectinatum, or in specific epithets such as Murex pecten. Some toothcombs are referred to as pectinations.

Oral use 
In ducks, they exist on the sides of the bill and serve both as a strainer for food and a comb for preening. Whales have a similar oral comb-like structure called baleen.

Retinal use 
The avian eye also contains a structure called a pecten oculi, which is a comb-like projection of the retina. It is thought to enhance nutrition for the cells of the retina.

Sensory use 
They also occur on the underside of scorpions, where they are used as sensory organs.

References 

Birds
Sensory receptors